Valaste Waterfall is the highest waterfall in Estonia and neighboring regions (30.5 m) situated between Ontika and Valaste in the Toila Parish of the Ida-Viru County and formed by a stream, as it flows over the Baltic Klint not far from the shore of the Gulf of Finland. It is a popular tourist attraction with its spray freezing up in winter.

There is a parking lot, some explanatory signs, and a trail using a double spiral staircase to get down the cliff. Opposite of the waterfall, a viewing platform has been built, and this offers views of the falls.

The platform went out of service and the stairs to it were closed since 2013.
A new staircase with platforms and walkways to the shore of the Gulf of Finland has been built and opened to the public in 2018.

Gallery

References

External links

Baltic Klint
Waterfalls of Estonia
Toila Parish
Landforms of Ida-Viru County
Tourist attractions in Ida-Viru County